God Is My Witness or As God Is My Witness may refer to:

Film and TV
Khuda Gawah, film 
As God is my witness, episode of Super Force
"As God Is My Witness", Mind Games (TV series) season finale directed by Kyle Killen
 Gone with the Wind (film)

Music
"As God Is My Witness", song by singer Shirley Bassey from The Performance 2009
"As God Is My Witness", song by Kenny Rogers. written Steve Glassmeyer, Warren Hartman from Across My Heart